Government Engineering College Bikaner, located in Bikaner, is an educational institution of the government of Rajasthan, India. The institute is affiliated with the Bikaner Technical University.

History
The college was founded in November 2000 with two branches (CSE and ECE) filling a total of 120 seats. In 2002, the college introduced four new branches, with intake increasing to 390. The college now provides postgraduate courses degree in M.Tech, MBA and MCA, undergraduate courses BCA and BBA, and B.Tech degree in six branches - CSE, ECE, EE, IT, ME and EIC with a total intake of 650 students.

But now, the intake of this college has raised to 600 seats in which mechanical and electrical has maximum students with two shifts for each, 60-60 in each shift (no difference between these two shifts), same time batches with two sections. Earlier, 3 years ago, the first shift ran in the morning and the second shift in daytime 12:00 onwards but now both run simultaneously.

Academics

Programmes
ECB offers a wide variety of courses of study in engineering, sciences,  management, design and humanities with a primary focus on engineering. Eight four-year undergraduate courses of study leading to the Bachelor of Technology degree. Postgraduate degrees award Master of Technology (M.Tech), Master of Science (M.Sc.), Master of Business Administration (M.B.A) and Master of Urban Planning.

Financial aid
More than 30 financial aid schemes are made available to students under different criteria to support institute fees and in some cases hostel accommodation as well

Requisites for enrollments
Admission to undergraduate courses of the institute is through the Rajasthan Engineering Admission Process (REAP) which takes into account the performance in Joint Entrance Examination (JEE) and/or percentage scored in Senior Secondary (12@th) standard.

References

External links

 Government Engineering College Bikaner - Official Website

Engineering colleges in Bikaner
Educational institutions established in 2000
2000 establishments in Rajasthan